Fuzhou Changle International Airport  is an international airport serving Fuzhou, the capital of Fujian province, China.  The airport was inaugurated on 23 June 1997, after being approved to start constructing in 1992. The current handling capacity is approximately 6.5 million people annually.

The airport is also a major hub for the namesake Fuzhou Airlines and XiamenAir.

In 2017, Fuzhou Airport handled 12,469,235 passengers and was 29th busiest in China by total passenger traffic. In 2016 the airport was the 23rd busiest airport in terms of cargo traffic and the 28th busiest airport by traffic movements.

History

Changle Airport was built to replace the old Fuzhou Yixu Airport, a dual-use military and civil airport located in Cangshan District, and prepared for the base of the direct flights to Taiwan across the straits. The airport was designed by Singaporean RSP Architects Planners & Engineers Pte Ltd. The government of Fujian province hoped that the new airport could reach the standard of Singapore Changi Airport, but they soon realized it was too big, and shrank the scale of the airport. However, the scale of the airport was still much bigger than the norm that central government approved. Changle Airport was opened in 1997. Due to the lack of Passenger flow, the airport had a great deficit in early years of operation. In 2003, the management of the airport was taken over by Xiamen International Airport Group, and began profiting from 2005.

In February 2017, Xiamen Airlines operated Changle's first direct route to North America, with a Boeing 787-9 service to New York–JFK airport. On 11 December 2018, a second intercontinental route to Paris was launched.

Future expansion
In September 2019, the National Development and Reform Commission approved for airport phase two expansion project. The project includes the following construction works:
 Construction of a 3600m x 60m second runway and relevant taxiway.
 Construction of a 255,000m2 second terminal.
 Construction of 60 new aircraft stands, eight cargo aircraft stands and relevant supporting facilities.
 Construction of second air traffic control tower and new 9000m² air traffic management centre.
 Reconstruction of existing air traffic control tower and air traffic management centre.
The airport targets 36 million passengers and 450,000 tonnes cargo per year by 2030 upon project completion.

Location 
Fuzhou Changle International Airport is located at 25°56´ north latitude and 119°39´ east longitude. It is surrounded by the sea on three sides. The surrounding area of the airport is flat, but it extends southwest and northeast, surrounded by mountains.

Traffic

Taxi 
There is a taxi waiting at the exit of the arrival hall. The city's unified price starts at 10 yuan / 3 kilometers, and 2 yuan per kilometer thereafter.

Bus 
The airport passenger terminal has a number of fixed shuttle routes to Fuzhou city and surrounding areas, opening hours from 4:30-22:30.

Highway 
There are many expressways that can directly reach Changle International Airport, such as Shenhai Expressway, Fuyin Expressway, and Airport Expressway.

Subway 
According to the newly released intercity railway construction plan for the west coast of Fujian Province, the Fuzhou-Changle Airport Intercity Railway (F1/3) will be directly connected to the airport, and will be passed by Metro Line 6 near the airport.

Climate 
Fuzhou Changle International Airport has a subtropical maritime climate, with the northeast monsoon prevailing in the winter half year and the southwest monsoon in the summer half year. There will be continuous rainy weather in spring. Due to typhoon and subtropical high pressure, there are often strong winds and heavy rains in summer. There will be continuously sunny weather in winter.

In addition to the southerly winds in the south of July, Changle Airport is dominated by the northerly winds in the other 11 months, and there are mountain hills in the west of the Changle Plain.

Typical climate characteristics of Changle Airport are: (1), cloudy, low cloud base; (2) abundant rainfall, large number of rainy days; (3) fast wind speed, large number of windy days, and the annual average wind speed is 4.5 m/s (4) the airport has less thunderstorms, but the airport airspace has frequent thunderstorms (5)well marked sea-land breeze effect (6) humid air, the annual average relative humidity is 75%.

Airlines and destinations

Passenger

Cargo

Delays

Statistics 
In 2017, the total throughput of Changle Airport ranked 28 in China, carrying passengers up to 12,469,235 throughout the year.

In the latest airport punctuality rate ranking in October 2018, Changle Airport ranked 16, which is 83.19%, with an average delay of 23 minutes. Delays of more than 60 minutes are rare, only 2.54%.

Causes

Thunderstorm 
Aviation and weather are closely connected. Thunderstorms are currently recognized as one of the most important weather phenomena that seriously affect the safety of airport and efficiency of flights. When flying in thunderstorms area, passengers and crew may encounter dangerous weather such as wind shear, bumps, hail, downburst, etc.

In recent years, Fuzhou Changle International Airport has experienced a rapid growth for flight delays and return flight due to thunderstorms. In 2016, the number of flights affected by thunderstorms at Changle Airport was 729, taking up 38.4% of the total number of flights affected by the weather. The annual average thunderstorm of Fuzhou Changle International Airport is 27.3d which is considerably frequent and has a greater impact on flight. Thunderstorms vary greatly from year to year, and thunderstorms may occur throughout the year. As the temperature rises, thunderstorms frequency begin to increase.

The main activity period of thunderstorms at Fuzhou Airport is from March to September. Thunderstorms appear most frequent in summer, with an average number of days of 13.5 days, accounting for 49.5 percent of the total number of thunderstorms in the year.

Compared to other months of the year, the thunderstorms in June showed the highest number, with an average of 5.1d. Most are dry thunderstorms and are not prone to rainfall.

Thunder mainly concentrated in the afternoon to the middle of the night, with the highest frequency occurring at 17: 00.

Thunderstorms may occur in all directions of Fuzhou Airport, among them, west direction has highest frequency, followed by the northwest and southwest directions. This is because the eastern part of the airport is the ocean, the west is the mountainous area, and the convection over the mountains is stronger than the ocean.

Visibility 
The average visibility in the first half of the year is less than 1000 meters. The number of days is significantly higher than that in the second half, accounting for 83% of the whole year. The visibility of the airport has obvious seasonal differences, showing the worst visibility in spring.

See also
List of airports in China
List of the busiest airports in China

References

Airports in Fujian
Transport in Fuzhou
Airports established in 1997
1997 establishments in China